Classmates is a 2006 Indian Malayalam-language coming-of-age romantic comedy-drama film directed by Lal Jose and written by James Albert. The film stars Prithviraj Sukumaran, Narain, Jayasurya, Indrajith Sukumaran and Kavya Madhavan with Jagathy Sreekumar, Balachandra Menon and Radhika in supporting roles. Alex Paul composed film's music while Rajeev Ravi handled the cinematography. The story revolves around the college graduate class of 1991. In 2006, working in different corners of the world, the friends get together for a class reunion to revive the joy and laughter of their student days. On the night of the reunion, one of the classmates is almost murdered and goes into a coma.

The film was released on 25 August 2006 to positive reviews from critics and became the highest-grossing Malayalam film of 2006. It is considered by many critics as one of the best campus based films in Malayalam. The film developed a cult following in the years after its release and is frequently referenced in popular Keralite culture. With the release of film, the concept of alumni meetings started trending in Kerala, and schools and colleges started organising such get togethers to help the ex-students keep in touch with each other. The film is now regarded as a classic in Malayalam cinema.

The film went on to win the Kerala State Film Awards for Best Popular Film (Prakash Damodaran and P. K. Muralidharan) and Best Story (James Albert). It was later remade into Tamil as Ninaithale Inikkum starring Prithviraj himself, and in Telugu and Marathi as Classmates (2007) and Classmates (2015), respectively.

Plot
The film centres on a group of classmates who attended the same Chemistry class in their final year of college. Among them, Murali is a singer and P. Sukumaran alias Suku is a firebrand leader of the left-winged students union. Pious, a rich and spoiled brat of parents settled in Gulf, is the campus Romeo and Sukumaran's best friend. Suku's rival Satheeshan leads the opposite faction of student politics and is aided by his sidekick Valu Vasu. Thara Kurup is the daughter of the Member of the state Legislative Assembly (MLA) from Muvattupuzha; she is a dancer who regularly wins awards for the college with her performances.

It was Murali's dream to have a  reunion, but he mysteriously dies before the reunion can be organised. His parents, Iyer and Lakshmi, both teachers at the college, decide to fulfill their deceased son's dream and bring his classmates together for a reunion. After 15 years, Sukumaran is now a diamond dealer based in Mumbai, a rich and successful businessman earning in crores and is a divorcee. Satheesan is now an MLA, following his dreams to become a minister, while Vasu continues to be his sidekick. Pious is now settled in the Middle East. Thara, while still unmarried, becomes a dancer and runs a dancing school.

The coming together of these classmates is the occasion for them to relive the past and to fulfil Murali's dream. When all are together, Raziya arrives. But during the occasion, Suku attempts suicide, but later many of them suspects that it was not a suicide. Pious reveals Suku's flashback to Iyer in the hospital.

When Satheeshan finds out that Suku and Thara are in love, he plans to separate them. He made her stand against Suku in an election in their college. On the day of the voting for the election, Satheeshan steals a letter that Thara wrote for Suku with Vasu's help and keeps it in the ballet box. Pious sees this. Angrily, Suku and his friends hit Satheeshan and his friends. Due to the fight, the vote counting gets postponed to the next day, and Principal Geevarghese calls the police and tells them to stay there. That night, Pious and Suku plan to take Thara's letter from the principal's room, but the plan fails. The next day, Thara's letter gets exposed. Satheeshan tells everyone including Thara that Suku misused her letter. Suku loses his mind, hits Satheeshan again, and tries to kill him. When he was going to kill him, a girl tells him that Murali is dead in the generator room of the hostel.

After Murali's funeral, Suku decides to discontinue his studies as he could not face the way that Thara was insulted. He goes to Mumbai and meets his neighbor Hameed, who introduces him to a diamond dealer named Shantharam. Suku becomes Shantharam's trusted man, and Shantharam helps Suku get his mother's illness treated and his sisters married. Shantharam got Suku married to his daughter Ratna, who was in love with a criminal. After Shantharam's death, Suku and Ratna got divorced and she went with her boyfriend. Pious reveals that Thara had some motive when she came there. Iyer goes to Thara and tells that she might have met him and to reveal the rest. Thara tells that she came to apologize for her mistakes to Suku. Thara reveals that when her parents discontinued her studies and decided to join a dance institute in Madras, she realized that few of her certificates are with Suku. She goes to Suku's house with Satheeshan to take them. After she takes the certificates and leaves, Suku's mother talks bad about him and curses him. Satheeshan gets emotional when he hears this as she told bad about him not about Suku. Thara gets angry when his mother tells him that. She thinks he cheated her and his family. Satheeshan then tells her that Suku discontinued his studies because of him and he was the one who put Thara's letter in the ballot box. She gets shocked. Mani Nair, who organized her first dance program, was in Mumbai and was Shantharam's family friend. He told Thara about Suku's marriage and divorce.

During the get-together, Thara called Suku to the generator room and they both reconciled. Iyer finds out that Raziya was there in the generator room when there was Suku and Thara. He called Raziya without asking anything and he knew that she had a few problems in the college. She took TC from the college and went which he did not know, but now he realizes that it had a link with Suku's and Thara's love. She tells him that she was in love with Murali. Her father finds about their love and discontinued her studies. But she tells Murali to come tonight to the generator room and to take her to their dreams in a letter and keeps it a book in the library. She waited a long time but did not see him and thought Murali cheated her. The next morning, she found him dead in the generator room. She did not know that he came before her and he died near her. Raziya gets shocked and becomes mad. Looking at her state, her father gets heartbroken and dies. Her relatives abandoned her as she got mad. She was alone in her home.

When Iyer called Raziya for the get-together, she was too happy and she thought to recremize the place where she and Murali was. During that time when she saw Suku and Thara reconciling, she felt her lost love. She also hears Suku revealing to Thara that on the day when Suku and Pious went to take Thara's letter, he hid in the generator room and somebody was there. He attacked the person and thought of making him unconscious with chloroform as he was Satheeshan's goon, but later he realizes that it was Murali and felt bad when he killed his friend. Raziya didn't realize that that he killed Murali by accident, and she strangles Suku with a string on Murali's guitar as a revenge for ruining her life. Pious calls Iyer and tells that Suku has gained consciousness. Iyer tells Pious that Raziya did it and Suku should not say her name to the police. But the police has already came to Suku's statement. Suku tells that he tried to commit suicide to the police. Suku apologies to Iyer for killing Murali and tells Iyer to kill him as he does not want to live with Raziya's and their curses. Iyer forgives him and tells that God has given a short life.

In the end, Suku moves to Mumbai while all greet him while he feels Murali too greeting him.

Cast

Prithviraj Sukumaran as P. Sukumaran  Suku
Narain as Murali Iyer
Jayasurya as Satheeshan Kanjikuzhi MLA
Indrajith Sukumaran as Pious George  PG
Kavya Madhavan as Thara Kurup
Radhika as Raziya
Balachandra Menon as Professor Iyer (College Lecturer/Murali's father)
Shobha Mohan as Lakshmi (College Lecturer/Murali's mother)
Jagathy Sreekumar as Fr. Esthappaan (College Lecturer/Men's Hostel Warden)
Vijeesh as Vasu Sadashivan/Vaalu Vasu
Anoop Chandran as 'Pazhanthuni' Koshi
J Pallassery as Fr. Geevarghese (College Principal)
Suraj Venjaramood as Ousepp
V. K. Sreeraman as Kunju Muhammad, Raziya's father
Sukumari as Janaki, Sukumaran's mother
Suja Menon as Bindu Balachandran
Anil Murali as SI Sudheer
Renjusha Menon as Kavitha
Soorya J Menon as Aiswarya 
Shajahan Rdx as Rahman
Lekshmi Viswanath as Mariya

Reception
The film was a box office success. It broke many box office records and spawned a whole new genre of college-based films in the Malayalam film industry. The film completed 150 days run in Thiruvananthapuram and 100 days in Kottayam and Ernakulam as well. The film went on to gross  and became the highest-grossing Malayalam film of the year.

Remakes
Classmates has been remade in Tamil as Ninaithale Inikkum, with Prithviraj playing the lead again. Narain is replaced by Shakthi Vasu and Kavya is replaced by Priyamani. A Telugu remake titled Classmates, with Sumanth and Sadha playing the lead roles, released in 2007. In 2015 it was remade in Marathi as Classmates.

Awards
 Radhika: Best Supporting Actress in Amrita Films Awards 2006
 James Albert: Best Scriptwriter in Asianet film awards
 James Albert: Kerala State Film Award for Best Story
 Kerala State Film Award for Popular Appeal and Aesthetic Value.
 Vineeth Sreenivasan: Best Male Playback singer.
 Asianet Film Award for Best Film

Soundtrack
The songs were written by Vayalar Sarath Chandra Varma and composed by Alex Paul. The Original Song From Ente Khalbile Was The Favourite.

References

External links
 
 Film Review at Gulf News

2000s Malayalam-language films
Malayalam films remade in other languages
Films directed by Lal Jose
Indian buddy films
Indian mystery films